Dmitri Aleksandrovich Kazionov (born May 13, 1984) is a Russian professional ice hockey forward. He currently playing on a tryout for HC Neftekhimik Nizhnekamsk of the Kontinental Hockey League (KHL). Kazionov was selected by Tampa Bay Lightning in the 4th round (100th overall) of the 2002 NHL Entry Draft. He formerly played alongside younger brother and fellow former Tampa Bay draft pick Denis in Metallurg Magnitogorsk.

Kazionov made his Kontinental Hockey League debut playing with Ak Bars Kazan during the inaugural 2008–09 KHL season.

Career statistics

Regular season and playoffs

International

References

External links

Dmitri Kazionov Profile at Russian Prospects

1984 births
Living people
Ak Bars Kazan players
HC Dynamo Moscow players
HC Lada Togliatti players
Metallurg Magnitogorsk players
Russian ice hockey centres
Severstal Cherepovets players
HC Sochi players
Tampa Bay Lightning draft picks
Torpedo Nizhny Novgorod players
Sportspeople from Perm, Russia
THK Tver players